(February 10, 1856 – September 14, 1921) was a Japanese daimyō of the Edo period, who served as the last lord of the Shimotsuma Domain. His court title was Iyo no kami. Under his leadership, Shimotsuma fought on the side of Aizu during the Boshin War.

Masaoto was created shishaku (viscount) in the Meiji-era kazoku nobility.

References
"Shimotsuma-han" on Edo 300 HTML (5 June 2008)

Daimyo
Kazoku
People of the Boshin War
1856 births
1921 deaths